Hicham El Guerrouj (born 14 September 1974) is a retired Moroccan middle-distance runner. El Guerrouj is the current world record holder of the outdoor 1500 metres, mile, and 2000 metres events. He also held indoor world records for the mile and 1500 metres until 2019, and is the only man since Paavo Nurmi to earn a gold medal in both the 1500 metres and 5000 metres at the same Olympic Games. El Guerrouj is widely regarded as the greatest middle-distance runner in history and is also viewed as one of the greatest athletes of all time. 

El Guerrouj has also won the world championship in the 1500 meters six times: four consecutive times outdoors in 1997, 1999, 2001, and 2003 and two times indoors in 1995 and 1997 and has won the World Athlete of the Year awards three times. He holds seven of the 10 fastest times ever run in the 1500 metres and in the mile. 

In November 2014, he was inducted into the International Association of Athletics Federations (IAAF) Hall of Fame.

Early career
Born in Berkane, Hicham El Guerrouj's first international triumph was at age 18, when he was third in the 5000 metres of the 1992 Junior World Championships in Seoul, behind Haile Gebrselassie of Ethiopia and Ismael Kirui of Kenya.  A year later, he was the #2 man on the Moroccan team at the World Junior Cross Country Championships.

In 1994, he was a member of the Moroccan team in the 1994 IAAF World Road Relay Championships, which won the race in world record time.

El Guerrouj rose to international prominence in the mid-1990s with near-record times in the 1500 metres and mile. At the age of 20 he finished second in the 1500 metres to then world record holder Noureddine Morceli at the 1995 World Championships in Gothenburg. In 1996 after setting a new personal best in the 1500 metres of 3:29.59 in Stockholm, he was considered one of the favourites for the Olympic gold.

1996 Atlanta Olympics – 1999 season
El Guerrouj competed in his first Olympic Games in 1996 at Atlanta. Running the 1500 metres final, as he was moving into position to challenge for the lead, he fell with 400 m to go and finished last in 12th place. He had been expected to challenge the world record holder and three-time World champion, Noureddine Morceli.

One month later, at the Grand Prix final in Milan, El Guerrouj became the first runner to defeat Morceli over 1500 m in four years. In the following years, El Guerrouj became the only middle distance runner to win four consecutive world titles in 1997, 1999, 2001, and 2003.

El Guerrouj set two world indoor records at the start of the 1997 season, starting with a 1500 m record of 3:31.18 at the Sparkassen Cup, which was not beaten until 22 years later, in 2019 by Samuel Tefera. He also set a new indoor best of 3:48.45 in the mile run at the Indoor Flanders meeting a few weeks later. In 1998 in Rome, El Guerrouj broke Morceli's 1500 m world record (3:27.37) with a time of 3:26.00.

In 1999, also in Rome, El Guerrouj broke the world record in the mile set by Noureddine Morceli in 1993, with a time of 3:43.13. Noah Ngeny of Kenya, who ran second, was also under the previous world record with a time of 3:43.40. This was the first time in over 40 years that two men had bettered the mile world record in the same race.

Later that season he set a new world record over 2000 m in Berlin at 4:44.79, bettering the previous mark set by Morceli by more than three seconds. He also ran the second fastest 3000 m ever in Brussels.

2000 Sydney Olympics – 2003 season
At the Sydney Olympics, El Guerrouj was favourite to take gold but finished second in the 1500 metres, behind Noah Ngeny, a talented Kenyan runner at the peak of his career who had run as El Guerrouj's pacemaker when El Guerrouj ran his 1500m world record in Rome in 1998.

El Guerrouj successfully defended his 1500 m title in the 2001 and 2003 World Championships and came close to breaking his own 1500 m record in Brussels in 2001 with a time of 3:26.12. He also won 3 consecutive IAAF Golden League prizes in 2001, 2002 and 2003. He was the only middle distance athlete to produce the winning streak necessary to be entitled for a share of the jackpot of 50 kilograms (1,608 troy ounces) of gold (2000–2002) or US$1 million (1998–1999, 2003–present). He remains the only athlete to have won it three times in a row.

In 2003, El Guerrouj set a personal best of 12:50.24 in the 5000 metres, which is the 26th fastest ever in the event. Later in the year, at the World Track & Field Championships, he finished a close second to Kenyan Eliud Kipchoge in the 5000 metres, adding a silver to the gold he had previously won in the 1500 metres.

2004 Athens Olympics and retirement

After a relatively poor start to the 2004 season that included slow times and an 8th-place finish in a 1500-metre race in Rome, El Guerrouj entered both the 1500 metres and the 5000 metres at the 2004 Summer Olympics in Athens, Greece.

Only 20 days before the Olympic final, 2000 Olympic bronze medalist Bernard Lagat ran the fastest 1500 m in 2004 (3:27.40), narrowly defeating El Guerrouj (3:27.64) at the Weltklasse Zürich meet on August 6. On August 24, in the final straight of the Olympic 1500m final, El Guerrouj beat Lagat by 0.12 seconds, winning the gold medal. In the finale, entering the home straight El Guerrouj led, only to be overtaken by Lagat- and then El Guerrouj re-took the lead a few strides from the line.

Four days later, El Guerrouj won the 5,000 m final with a time of 13:14.39, preventing Kenenisa Bekele from achieving the 5000 m/10000 m distance double, last achieved by Ethiopian Miruts Yifter in 1980 Moscow Olympics.

El Guerrouj became the first man in 80 years to win both 1500m and 5000m titles in the same Olympics, previously achieved only by the "Flying Finn" Paavo Nurmi in 1924.

Having fulfilled his sporting ambitions, El Guerrouj never competed internationally again and announced his retirement on May 22, 2006.

Awards and honors
His sporting career is marked by numerous recognitions such as the award to humanitarian effort from the International Association of Athletics Federations (IAAF), which he received in 1996. He is also a UNICEF Goodwill Ambassador. El Guerrouj was named IAAF World Athlete of the Year in 2001, 2002 and 2003 after remaining unbeaten in more than 20 races, becoming the first man to win the award in consecutive years. He was also named best athlete of the year by the athletics journal Track and Field News in 2002. In 2003, he was elected as a member of the IAAF Athletes Committee.

On September 7, 2004, El Guerrouj was decorated with the "Cordon de Commandeur" by King Mohammed VI of Morocco. In the same year, he was awarded the Prince of Asturias Awards.

He was a member of the International Olympic Committee Athletes' Commission from 2004 to 2012.

Hicham El Guerrouj is today an Ambassador for Peace and Sport, a Monaco-based international organization, as well as a member of its "Champions for Peace" club, a group of 54 famous elite athletes committed to serving peace in the world through sport.

International competitions

IAAF Grand Prix performances
1997
Stuttgart: 3:31.18 indoor 1500 m
Gand: 3:48.45 indoor mile
1998
Golden Gala: 3:26.00  1500 m
1999
Golden Gala: 3:43.13  mile
1999 IAAF Grand Prix Final: 4:44.79  2000 metres

Personal bests
The following table includes El Guerrouj's personal best times as published by the IAAF:

Awards
 World Athlete of the Year: 2001, 2002, 2003
 Track & Field News Athlete of the Year: 1999, 2001, 2002
 L'Équipe Champion of Champions: 2005
 IAAF Hall of Fame: 2014

See also
 1500 metres world record progression
 Mile run world record progression

References and notes

External links

 Video of Hicham El Guerrouj breaking the mile world record
 El Guerrouj diary at IAAF
 
 
 

1974 births
Living people
People from Berkane
Moroccan male middle-distance runners
Moroccan male long-distance runners
Olympic athletes of Morocco
Olympic gold medalists for Morocco
Olympic silver medalists for Morocco
Athletes (track and field) at the 1996 Summer Olympics
Athletes (track and field) at the 2000 Summer Olympics
Athletes (track and field) at the 2004 Summer Olympics
Medalists at the 2004 Summer Olympics
World Athletics Championships athletes for Morocco
World Athletics Championships medalists
World Athletics record holders
International Olympic Committee members
Medalists at the 2000 Summer Olympics
Olympic gold medalists in athletics (track and field)
Olympic silver medalists in athletics (track and field)
World Athletics indoor record holders
IAAF Golden League winners
Track & Field News Athlete of the Year winners
World Athletics Indoor Championships winners
World Athletics Championships winners
20th-century Moroccan people
21st-century Moroccan people